Dictamnus is a genus of flowering plant in the family Rutaceae, native to temperate Eurasia from Spain to China. The genus was first described by Carl Linnaeus in 1753.

Species
, Plants of the World Online accepted two species:
Dictamnus albus L.
Dictamnus dasycarpus Turcz.

References

Zanthoxyloideae
Zanthoxyloideae genera